Ciuperceni is a commune in Gorj County, Oltenia, Romania. It is composed of seven villages: Boboiești, Ciuperceni, Peșteana-Vulcan, Priporu, Strâmba-Vulcan, Vârtopu and Zorzila.

References

Communes in Gorj County
Localities in Oltenia